Andrei Makarov (born January 25, 1966) is a Russian former professional ice hockey player. He played in the Russian Superleague as a member of Metallurg Novokuznetsk.

References

External links
 

1966 births
Living people
Metallurg Novokuznetsk players
Russian ice hockey centres